Protected areas in Mozambique are known as conservation areas, and are currently grouped into national parks, national reserves, forest reserves, wildlife utilisation areas (coutadas), community conservation areas, and private game farms (fazendas de bravio). There are also a number of areas that have been declared as protected areas under a variety of different legislation, which for reasons of simplicity are here grouped together as "other protected areas." Under the Conservation Law of 2014 (Law 16/2014 of June 20), the protected areas will need to be reclassified into a much more flexible series of new categories which are closer to the international system used by the IUCN. International initiatives such as transfrontier parks are grouped at the end of the page.

National parks
 Banhine National Park, Parque Nacional de Banhine - Gaza (7,250 km2)
 Bazaruto National Park, Parque Nacional do Arquipelago de Bazaruto - Inhambane (1,463 km2)
 Chimanimani National Park, Parque Nacional de Chimanimani - Manica (656 km2)
 Gorongosa National Park, Parque Nacional da Gorongosa - Sofala (5,370 km2)
 Limpopo National Park, Parque Nacional do Limpopo - Gaza (11,233 km2)
 Magoe National Park, Parque Nacional do Magoe - Tete (3,558 km2)
 Quirimbas National Park, Parque Nacional das Quirimbas - Cabo Delgado (9,130 km2)
 Zinave National Park, Parque Nacional do Zinave - Inhambane (4,000 km2)

National reserves
 Gilé National Reserve, Reserva Nacional do Gilé - Zambézia (4,436 km2)
 Maputo Special Reserve, Reserva Especial de Maputo - Maputo (1,040 km2)
 Marromeu Buffalo Reserve, Reserva de Búfalos de Marromeu - Sofala (1,500 km2)
 Niassa National Reserve, Reserva Nacional do Niassa - Niassa (42,200 km2)
 Pomene National Reserve, Reserva National de Pomene - Inhambane (50 km2)

Other protected areas
 Lake Niassa Partial Marine Reserve, Reserva Marinha Parcial de Lago Niassa - Niassa (486 km2)
 Malhazine Municipal Park, Parque Ecológico de Malhazine - Maputo City (5.6 km2)
 Ponta do Ouro Partial Marine Reserve, Reserva Marinha Parcial de Ponta do Ouro - Maputo (673 km2)
 Primeiras and Segundas Islands Environmental Protected Area, Área de Protecção Ambiental do Arquipélago das Ilhas Primeiras e Segundas- Zambezia, Nampula (10,409 km2)
 Sao Sebastiao Total Protection Area, Area de Proteccao Total de Sao Sebastiao - Inhambane (439 km2)

Community conservation areas
 Chipanje Chetu (6,065 km2)
 Mitcheu (113 km2)
 Tchuma Tchato (31,838 km2)

Wildlife utilisation areas
 Coutada 4 - Manica (4,300 km2)
 Coutada 5 - Sofala (6,868 km2)
 Coutada 6 - Sofala (4,563 km2) - extinguished in 2014
 Coutada 7 - Manica (5,408 km2)
 Coutada 8 - Sofala (310 km2) - extinguished in 2014; became the Mitcheu Community Conservation Area
 Coutada 9 - Manica (4,333 km2)
 Coutada 10 - Sofala (2,008 km2)
 Coutada 11 - Sofala (1,928 km2)
 Coutada 12 - Sofala (2,963 km2)
 Coutada 13 - Manica (5,683 km2)
 Coutada 14 - Sofala (1,353 km2)
 Coutada 15 - Sofala (2,300 km2)
 Coutada 16 - now part of the Limpopo National Park
 Luabo (558 km2)
 Lureco (2,226 km2)
 Marupa
 Messalo (1,227 km2)
 Micaúne (240 km2)
 Mulela (964 km2)
 Nacúma (2,713 km2)
 Nicage (Cabo Delgado) (5,400 km2)
 Nipepe (1,382 km2)
 Nungo (3,288 km2)

Forest reserves
 Baixo Pinda (196 km2)
 Derre (1,700 km2)
 Inhamitanga (16 km2)
 Licuáti (37 km2)
 Maronga (83 km2)
 Matibane (512 km2)
 Mecuburi (2,300 km2)
 Moribane (53 km2)
 M'palue (51 km2)
 Mucheve (91 km2)
 Nhampacue (170 km2)
 Ribáuè (52 km2)
 Zomba (28 km2)

Private game farms
As of 2014, there were 50 private game farms in Mozambique.

Ramsar sites
 Lake Niassa Ramsar Complex
 Marromeu Complex

Transfrontier conservation areas
 Chimanimani Transfrontier Conservation Area - established in 1999 between the Mozambique and Zimbabwe governments
Extension: 2.056 km2
Composition: Mozambique (Chimanimani National Reserve); Zimbabwe (Chimanimani National Park)
 Limpopo Transfrontier Conservation Area - established at December 10, 2004 among the Mozambique, Zimbabwe and South Africa governments
Extension: 84.868 km2
Composition: Mozambique (Limpopo, Banhine and Zinave National Parks); Zimbabwe (Gonarezhou, Manjinji Pan Sanctuary, Malipati Safari Area, Sengwe Community Area); South Africa (Kruger National Park, Makulele Region)
 Lubombo Transfrontier Conservation Area - cross border established in June, 2000 among the Mozambique, Swaziland and South Africa governments
Extension: 4.170 km2
Composition: Maputo Elephant Reserve (Mozambique), Tembe Elephant Park (South Africa) and Lubombo Conservancy (Eswatini)

See also
 List of national parks in Africa

References

 Parks and Reserves – National Administration of Conservation Areas (ANAC)

 
Nature conservation in Mozambique
Mozambique
Protected areas
Mozambique geography-related lists